Impulse is a 1984 American science fiction thriller film directed by Graham Baker and starring Tim Matheson, Meg Tilly and Hume Cronyn. The film's plot is about the residents of a small rural town who start to exhibit strange and violent behavior after a small earthquake ruptures the seal on a toxic waste burial site.

Plot
Stuart and his girlfriend Jennifer come to the town to visit her hospitalized mother.  The couple begin to notice increasingly odd behavior by several of the townspeople.  Although Stuart drinks the local milk, Jennifer does not.  As the day progresses, the townspeople and Stuart begin to exhibit signs of violent and extreme sexual behavior.  Jennifer visits her friend Margo where she observes evidence that she broke her son's arm. When Jennifer tries to leave in her car, she finds the kids have slashed her tires. When she tries to leave in Margo's car, the kids trap her in the garage and set it on fire. Jennifer barely escapes with her life. The local doctor euthanizes Jennifer's mother and then takes his own life. Stuart discovers that Jennifer's brother Eddie harbors incestuous feelings for her and kills him. As the town descends into chaos and Stuart becomes violent, Jennifer flees in a pickup truck but gets stuck outside of town.

At the same time, Stuart escapes to the woods where he discovers the recently repaired toxic waste vault which he follows to the milk facility. He then begins to walk back to town, but comes across Jennifer in the stuck pickup truck. He helps free the truck, then warns her that as the only uninfected person she needs to leave, but he intends to return to town to help as best he can. Then, two men are seen loading a biplane with barrels of liquid. After the plane takes off, Stuart walks up to the other man whose government vehicle is filled with radios, on which he hears talk about spraying the town. Stuart deduces this man has some connection with the events in the town, but when he confronts the man, he shoots Stuart down with a shotgun. Jennifer, who had turned around to return to town, witnesses the man kill her boyfriend. She then runs down the man with her pickup truck and kills him. There are views of the town littered with corpses and a news item that government agencies have no explanation for the mass death of the entire town.

Cast
 Tim Matheson as Stuart
 Meg Tilly as Jennifer
 Hume Cronyn as Dr. Carr
 John Karlen as Bob Russell
 Bill Paxton as Eddie
 Amy Stryker as Margo
 Claude Earl Jones as Sheriff
 Robert Wightman as Howard
 Lorinne Vozoff as Mrs. Russell
 Peter Jason as Man in Truck

References

External links
  at MGM.com
 
 

1984 films
1984 horror films
1980s disaster films
American science fiction thriller films
1980s science fiction thriller films
American disaster films
Films directed by Graham Baker
20th Century Fox films
ABC Motion Pictures films
Films scored by Paul Chihara
Films produced by Tim Zinnemann
1980s English-language films
1980s American films